= Alejandro Mesco =

Peruvian Anglican bishop

Alejandro Mesco is an Anglican Bishop.

Mesco was consecrated in 2015 as an Auxiliary Bishop in Peru.
